Van Aerde is a surname. Notable people with the surname include:

Michel Van Aerde (1933–2020), Belgian bike racer
Rogier van Aerde (1917–2007), pseudonym of Adolf Josef Hubert Frans van Rijen 
 

Surnames of Dutch origin